Doriana Pigliapoco (born 25 November 1957) is an Italian fencer. She competed in the women's team foil event at the 1976 Summer Olympics.

References

1957 births
Living people
Italian female fencers
Olympic fencers of Italy
Fencers at the 1976 Summer Olympics